Kevin Joseph Pangos (born January 26, 1993) is a Canadian-Slovenian professional basketball player for Olimpia Milano of the Italian Lega Basket Serie A (LBA) and the EuroLeague. He spent his college basketball career playing for the Gonzaga Bulldogs of the West Coast Conference. He was named the 2015 WCC Player of the Year, as well as a third-team All-American by Sporting News. Pangos has also represented Canada on the international stage.

Early life

Pangos is a third-generation Slovene Canadian as his paternal grandparents emigrated to Canada from the former Yugoslav Republic. He has a Slovenian passport.
Like many young Canadians, Pangos played youth hockey. He had family connections to the game—an uncle played in the NHL, and a cousin was drafted by the Washington Capitals—but he did not like the sport as much as basketball. In any event, he had much deeper family links to that sport. His father Bill played basketball for the University of Toronto and finished his 26th season as the head women's basketball coach at York University in Toronto in 2013, his mother Patty played Canadian Interuniversity Sport basketball at McMaster University, and his sister Kayla played under their father at York.

Growing up, Pangos' biggest inspiration was Steve Nash, a Canadian who developed into one of the NBA's top point guards and a two-time MVP. At training camps throughout his youth, Pangos paid special attention to stories about Nash; he recalled in a 2013 interview, "Someone would say, 'Steve Nash would make 500 shots a day.' I figured I had to make 500 shots a day."

Although he played for various national and provincial youth squads, he frequently trained alone or with his father, as he found relatively little high-level competition in Ontario.

High school career
Pangos played for Dr. John M. Denison Secondary School in Newmarket, Ontario. In his senior season, he led Denison to the OFSAA Triple-A title game where he scored a game-high 26 points in a 69–64 loss to Anderson CVI. He is highly respected for being one of the top players to come from a high school in the Regional Municipality of York .

College career

Pangos received offers from several NCAA Division I schools including Michigan, Temple, UNLV, Portland, and Cincinnati. Notably, he and Trey Burke were both offered scholarships to Michigan, but only on a first-come, first-served basis; Burke accepted first. Pangos opted for Gonzaga after receiving favorable reviews from Kelly Olynyk and his family; the Pangos and Olynyk families are longtime friends in the closely knit Canadian basketball community.

In his second NCAA game against Washington State he scored 33 points and tied a school record with nine three-pointers made in an 89–81 victory. This game kicked off a stellar 2011-12 freshman season at Gonzaga, as Pangos led the team in many statistical categories including points, assists, steals, minutes played, 3-pointers made, and free throw percentage. He helped Gonzaga to a 13–3 record in the West Coast Conference, good enough for second place, and a 26–7 overall record.

In the WCC semi-finals Pangos led Gonzaga by BYU in a 77–58 victory, scoring a game-high 30 points on 10–17 shooting. Pangos did not perform well in the 2012 West Coast Conference finals in a 78–74 overtime loss to Saint Mary's. Pangos shot just 3–18 from the field and 1–10 from three-point range.

Gonzaga entered the 2012 NCAA men's basketball tournament as a #7 seed.  In his first NCAA tournament appearance, Pangos scored 13 points on 5–7 shooting and added 5 assists in a lop-sided 77–54 victory over West Virginia; however, Gonzaga would lose to #2-seeded Ohio State in the third round of the tournament 73–66. Pangos would score just 10 points on 3–13 shooting.

On January 29, 2015, against Portland, Pangos broke Blake Stepp's school record of 288 made 3-pointers. As of March 11, 2015, Pangos currently has a school-record of 313 3-pointers, which is good enough for fifth place all-time in West Coast Conference men's basketball.

Professional career

Gran Canaria (2015–2016)

On July 24, 2015, Pangos signed a two-year deal with the Spanish club Herbalife Gran Canaria.

Žalgiris (2016–2018)
In 2016, Pangos joined the Lithuanian club Žalgiris, with whom Pangos signed a "1+1" deal. In May 2018, he was named the All-EuroLeague Second Team for the 2017–18 season. With Žalgiris, he reached the 2018 EuroLeague Final Four, the team's first participation in 20 years. There, the team finished in third place after losing to Fenerbahçe and defeating CSKA Moscow.

Barcelona (2018–2020)
On July 25, 2018, Pangos signed a two-year deal with FC Barcelona Lassa of the Liga ACB and the EuroLeague. Due to an injury, he played three games during the 2019-20 season. Pangos parted ways with Barcelona on July 5, 2020.

Zenit Saint Petersburg (2020–2021)
On July 6, 2020, Pangos signed with Zenit Saint Petersburg of the VTB United League and the EuroLeague. He had an exceptionally productive season in Russia, making the All-EuroLeague First Team in the process and averaging 13.5 points and 6.6 assists per game. On July 23, 2021, Pangos officially parted ways with Zenit.

Cleveland Cavaliers (2021–2022)
On September 17, 2021, Pangos signed with the Cleveland Cavaliers. On February 19, 2022, he was waived.

On February 23, 2022, Pangos joined Russian club CSKA Moscow, signing a contract until the end of the 2023–2024 season. He did not make his debut with the team due to subsequent 2022 Russian invasion of Ukraine and its implications.

Olimpia Milano (2022–present)
On July 27, 2022, Pangos signed for Olimpia Milano of the Lega Basket Serie A (LBA) and the EuroLeague.

National team career
Pangos played for the 2009 Canadian Cadet Men's National team that won bronze at the 2009 FIBA Americas Under-16 Championship, where he averaged 18.4 points, 5.4 rebounds, 3.8 assists, and 3.2 steals per game.

Pangos also represented Canada at the 2010 FIBA Under-17 World Championship, where he averaged 15.8 points, 5 rebounds, and 1.3 steals per game, en route to a bronze-medal game victory over Lithuania. He was named to the All-Tournament Team.

In 2011, Pangos travelled with Canada's Under-19 men's basketball team to Latvia, for the 2011 FIBA Under-19 World Championship. He finished second on the team in scoring, averaging 13.5 points per game, and led the team in assists, with 3.1 per game Pangos finished fourth among the tournament in steals per game leaders, averaging 2.1 per game.

On May 24, 2022, Pangos agreed to a three-year commitment to play with the Canadian senior men's national team.

Career statistics

NBA

|-
| style="text-align:left;"| 
| style="text-align:left;"| Cleveland
| 24 || 3 || 6.9 || .326 || .231 || .750 || .5 || 1.3 || .1 || .0 || 1.6
|- class="sortbottom"
| style="text-align:center;" colspan="2"| Career
| 24 || 3 || 6.9 || .326 || .231 || .750 || .5 || 1.3 || .1 || .0 || 1.6

EuroLeague

|-
| style="text-align:left;"| 2016–17
| style="text-align:left;" rowspan=2| Žalgiris
| 30 || 30 || 20.8 || .381 || .457 || .862 || 1.8 || 3.2 || .9 || .0 || 8.7 || 7.2
|-
| style="text-align:left;"| 2017–18
| 36 || 36 || 27.5 || .483 || .475 || .754 || 2.7 || 5.9 || .7 || .1 || 12.7 || 14.2
|-
| style="text-align:left;"| 2018–19
| style="text-align:left;" | Barcelona
| 35 || 16 || 20.3 || .386 || .317 || .741 || 1.1 || 3.2 || .4 || .0 || 7.0 || 6.1
|-
| style="text-align:left;"| 2020–21
| style="text-align:left;" | Zenit 
| 39 || 39 || 29.0 || .449 || .390 || .845 || 2.1 || 6.7 || .7 || .0 || 13.5 || 14.8
|- class="sortbottom"
| style="text-align:center;" colspan=2| Career
| 140 || 121 || 24.6 || .434 || .414 || .797 || 1.9 || 4.8 || .7 || .0 || 10.6 || 10.8

Liga ACB

Awards and achievements
2015 CBB 3-point Contest Champion
2012 WCC Newcomer of the Year
2012 First Team All-WCC
2012 WCC All-Freshman Team.
2013 First Team All-WCC
2014 First Team All-WCC
2015 First Team All-WCC
2015 WCC Player of the Year
2015 Sporting News Third Team All-American

References

External links

Kevin Pangos at acb.com 
Kevin Pangos at eurobasket.com
Kevin Pangos at euroleaguebasketball.net

Gonzaga Bulldogs bio

1993 births
Living people
2019 FIBA Basketball World Cup players
All-American college men's basketball players
Basketball people from Ontario
BC Žalgiris players
BC Zenit Saint Petersburg players
Canadian expatriate basketball people in Lithuania
Canadian expatriate basketball people in Russia
Canadian expatriate basketball people in Spain
Canadian expatriate basketball people in the United States
Canadian men's basketball players
Canadian people of Dutch descent
Canadian people of Slovenian descent
CB Gran Canaria players
Cleveland Cavaliers players
Cleveland Charge players
FC Barcelona Bàsquet players
Gonzaga Bulldogs men's basketball players
Liga ACB players
People from East Gwillimbury
Point guards
Shooting guards
Slovenian expatriate basketball people in Lithuania
Slovenian expatriate basketball people in Russia
Slovenian expatriate basketball people in Spain
Slovenian men's basketball players
Undrafted National Basketball Association players